Wyoming Highway 252 (WYO 252) is a  Wyoming state road in Natrona County, serving the areas just south of the City of Casper. It is locally known as Garden Creek Road from WYO 251 to the Casper city line where it becomes South Poplar Street.

Route description
Wyoming Highway 252 begins its southern end at Wyoming Highway 251 (Casper Mountain Road) south of Casper. Highway 252 proceeds southwest for a just under a mile before turning west. However, one mile later WYO 252 turns again, this time north as it crosses Garden Creek for which it is named after. Highway 251 now will roughly parallel Garden Creek for the remainder of its routing to Casper. At 3.99 miles, WYO 251 enters Casper and shortly thereafter reaches Wyoming Highway 258 (Wyoming Boulevard) its northern terminus at 4.37 miles. The mileposts for Highway 252 increase from south to north.

Major intersections

References

External links 

Wyoming State Routes 200-299
WYO 252 - WYO 251 to WYO 258

Transportation in Natrona County, Wyoming
252